Travaglio is an Italian surname. Notable people with the surname include:

Guy Travaglio, (1926–2019), American politician and businessman
Marco Travaglio (born 1964), Italian investigative journalist, writer, and commentator

See also
Travaglia

Italian-language surnames